Hamilton Health Sciences (HHS)] is a hospital network of seven hospitals and a cancer centre serving Hamilton, Ontario, Canada. In 2022, it was recognized as a top employer in the Hamilton-Niagara region and a top employer of young people in Canada.

Hospitals
Hamilton General Hospital
McMaster University Medical Centre
McMaster Children's Hospital
Juravinski Hospital
St. Peter's Hospital
West Lincoln Memorial Hospital
Juravinski Cancer Centre
West End Clinic / Urgent Care Centre
Ron Joyce Children's Health Centre
Regional Rehabilitation Centre
David Braley Research Institute
Satellite Health Facility

Overview

Hamilton Health Sciences (HHS) was formed in 1996 when Hamilton General, Henderson General, McMaster and Chedoke hospitals merged to form Hamilton Health Sciences Corporation; this union formed one of the largest teaching hospitals in Ontario with four sites, approximately 8,000 employees and 1,000 physicians. 

In 2003, Juravinski Cancer Centre joined HHS, followed by St. Peter’s Hospital in 2008. In 2010, Henderson General Hospital was renamed Juravinski Hospital, and in 2014, West Lincoln Memorial Hospital joined the organization.

The David Braley Cardiac, Vascular and Stroke Research Institute opened in 2010 and is located behind the Hamilton General Hospital. It is a $90 million research centre and employees nearly 500 scientists. David Braley contributed $10 million towards the project.

The Ron Joyce Children's Centre, which opened in the fall 2015, is the only centre of its kind in Canada. The purpose-built facility houses a variety of programs including: Autism Spectrum Disorder Service, Child and Youth Mental Health Program, Developmental Pediatrics and Rehabilitation Program, Prosthetics and Orthotics Services and Audiology Services. It is situated on the Hamilton General Hospital campus but administratively part of McMaster Children’s Hospital.

Today, Hamilton Health Sciences is a community of 15,000 staff, physicians, researchers and volunteers that proudly serves southwestern Ontario residents. HHS also provides specialized, advanced care to people from across the province.

HHS offers world-leading expertise in many areas, including cardiac and stroke care, cancer care, palliative care and pediatrics.

HHS is a world-renowned hospital for health care research. HHS focuses daily on improving the quality of care for their patients through innovation and evidence-based practices.

As the largest employer in the Greater Hamilton region, HHS plays a vital role in training the next generation of health professionals in collaboration with their academic partners, including McMaster University and Mohawk College.

Hamilton Health Sciences Foundation is a registered charitable organization that supports six of the hospitals and the cancer centre within Hamilton Health Sciences.

The current president and chief executive officer of Hamilton Health Sciences is Rob MacIsaac.

References

Hospitals in Ontario
Organizations based in Hamilton, Ontario